Linda Sue Fratianne (born August 2, 1960) is an American former figure skater known for winning two World Championship titles (1977, 1979), four consecutive U.S. Championships (1977–1980), and a silver medal in the 1980 Winter Olympics.

Personal life 
Fratianne was married to ski racer Nick Maricich.

Career 
Throughout her figure skating career, Fratianne was coached by Frank Carroll. She remained loyal whilst other switched to get a better deal.

Fratianne became the first female skater to land two different types of triple jumps (toe loop and Salchow) in her free skating programs in 1976 at the U.S. National Championships, finishing in second place. The next year, Fratianne took the gold. 

At the World Figure Skating Championship in Tokyo, Japan in 1977, Fratianne won her first world title by upsetting the favorite going into the Championship: East Germany's Anett Pötzsch. Although Fratianne fell on her triple salchow jump in her free skating routine, the judges considered she was better overall than Pötzsch.

In 1979, Fratianne was able to regain her world title, which she had lost to Pötzsch in 1978 in Ottawa, Canada.

Her chief rivals were Anett Pötzsch (East Germany), Emi Watanabe (Japan), and Dagmar Lurz (West Germany). Like Watanabe, her compulsory figures were significantly weaker than her free skating; consequently, she frequently placed well below Pötzsch and Lurz in the compulsories, forcing her to attempt to overcome her deficiencies through strong short and free programs. In the short and free programs, Fratianne never placed lower than Pötzsch or Lurz between 1977 and 1980 in any competition. However, since the rules at the time placed much weight on compulsory figures, she was only able to win a major title twice.

At the 1980 Winter Olympics, Fratianne placed third in the compulsory figures, first in the short program, and second in the free skate to place second overall, while Pötzsch took the gold with 1st in figures, 4th in the short program, and 3rd in the free skate. There have been persistent allegations that Fratianne was "robbed" of the gold medal by a conspiracy among Eastern-bloc judges, but in fact only two of the nine judges on the panel were from Eastern-bloc countries and only the judges from Japan and the USA placed Fratianne first. All others placed Pötzsch first, mainly due to her substantial lead in the compulsory figures.

After the 1980 Winter Games, Fratianne turned professional and, at the 1980 world championships, won the bronze medal behind Anett Pötzsch and Dagmar Lurz from West Germany.

In 1981, the scoring system in figure skating was modified to combine the results of the compulsory figures, short program, and free skating by adding placements instead of carrying over raw scores.  This made it less likely that skaters could build up a huge lead in the compulsory figures. This decision was made long before the 1980 Winter Olympics.

After the 1980 season, Fratianne retired from competitive skating and performed in touring shows, including ten years as a lead skater of Disney on Ice. In 1993, she was inducted into the United States Figure Skating Hall of Fame.

Results

References

External links

Linda Fratianne. IMDb
 Fratianne-Poetzsch: Clearing the Record
 Detailed results from the 1980 Olympics

1960 births
American female single skaters
American people of Italian descent
Figure skaters at the 1976 Winter Olympics
Figure skaters at the 1980 Winter Olympics
Olympic silver medalists for the United States in figure skating
Living people
Olympic medalists in figure skating
World Figure Skating Championships medalists
Medalists at the 1980 Winter Olympics
21st-century American women